Afarit el-asphalt (The Asphalt Boogeymen) is a 1996 Egyptian action-thriller film directed by Oussama Fawzi and produced by Hany Gerges Fawzi for Aflam Guirguiss Fawzy. The film stars Mahmoud Hemida and Salwa Khattab in lead roles where as Hasan Husni, Lotfy Labib, Gamil Ratib and Mohammed Tawfik made supportive roles.

The film had its premier at Locarno Film Festival in Switzerland on 11 August 1996.

Plot

Cast
 Mahmoud Hemida as Sayed		
 Salwa Khattab		
 Abdalla Mahmoud		
 Gamil Ratib		
 Hasan Husni as Hassan Hosny
 Aida Abdel Aziz as Tafeda
 Lotfy Labib as Saleh
 Mohammed Tawfik as Ali
 Manal Afifi as Bataa
 Amal Ibrahim as Zahia
 Mohamed Sharaf as Shaban
 Maged El-Kidwani as Halazona
 Shabaan Abdel Rehim as Singer
 Kamal Soleiman		
 Alaa Awad

References

External links
 

1996 films
1996 action films
Egyptian action drama films